The Great Wall Station is the first Chinese research station in Antarctica and opened on 20 February 1985.

History
In 1984, China organized its first scientific expedition to Antarctica, and Guo Kun was named the leader of the 591-member expedition team. The team departed Shanghai on 20 November 1984 on two ships, the Xiang Yang Hong 10 and the J121, and arrived at King George Island off the coast of Antarctica on 30 December. A main part of their mission was to construct China's first antarctic base, the Great Wall Station. As the Xiang Yang Hong 10 was not an icebreaker, the team had to leave before the end of the antarctic summer and had only a short window of opportunity to complete their mission. Under Guo's supervision, the team worked 16 to 17 hours a day in often severe weather conditions, and completed the construction in only 40 days. Construction of the station was completed on 14 February 1985.

In summer, the station holds up to 60 people; in winter, 14. It marks the beginning of China’s presence in Antarctica and its Antarctic research program.

In 2012, the Antarctic Treaty System designated two sites at the station as Historic Sites and Monuments in Antarctica following nominations by China: a monolith erected to commemorate the establishment of the station and the station's No.1 Building.

See also
 List of Antarctic research stations
 List of Antarctic field camps
Antarctic Zhongshan Station
Antarctic Kunlun Station
Antarctic Taishan Station
Polar Research Institute of China
MV Xue Long
Arctic Yellow River Station

References

Bibliography

External links

 Official website Polar Research Institute of China
 Official website Chinese Arctic and Antarctic Administration 
 COMNAP Antarctic Facilities Map

Outposts of the South Shetland Islands
China and the Antarctic
Buildings and structures completed in 1985
Polar Research Institute of China
Historic Sites and Monuments of Antarctica
1985 establishments in Antarctica